Galović is a Croatian surname. Notable people with the surname include:

Đuka Galović (1924–2015), Croatian folk musician and songwriter
Nino Galović (born 1992), Croatian footballer
Viktor Galović (born 1990), Croatian tennis player

See also
Galović, a village in Serbia
Galović Selo, a village in Croatia

Croatian surnames
Slavic-language surnames
Patronymic surnames